The Ministry of Foreign Affairs of Chile is the cabinet-level administrative office in charge of planning, directing, coordinating, executing, controlling and informing the foreign policy formulated by the President of Chile. It is located in the Edificio José Miguel Carrera at Plaza de la Constitución (Constitution Square), in downtown Santiago.

The present Minister of Foreign Affairs (who is also known colloquially as Chancellor) is Alberto van Klaveren.

History
The office was first organized in 1812, during the War of Independence, under the name of Foreign Affairs Secretariat. It was abolished in 1814, after the Battle of Rancagua, when the Spanish government was re-established.

In 1818, after independence, the secretariat was re-established, but this time as a dependency of the Ministry of the Interior, which at that time was named "Ministry of Government and Foreign Affairs" (1818 - 1824) or "Ministry of the Interior and Foreign Affairs" (1824 - 1871).  In 1871 is established as a separate government entity.

Since its current creation in 1871, it has undergone different reorganizations, reflected in its different names:
Ministry of Foreign Affairs and Colonization 1871-1887
Ministry of Foreign Affairs and Worship 1887-1896
Ministry of Foreign Affairs, Worship and Colonization 1896-1924
Ministry of Foreign Affairs 1924-1929, and again since 1941
Ministry of Foreign Affairs and Commerce 1930-1941

Titulars

Ministers of Foreign Affairs and Colonization

Ministers of Foreign Affairs and Worship

Ministers of Foreign Affairs, Worship and Colonization

Ministers of Foreign Affairs (First Creation)

Ministers of Foreign Affairs and Commerce

Ministers of Foreign Affairs (Second creation)

Additional information

See also
Foreign relations of Chile
List of diplomatic missions in Chile
List of diplomatic missions of Chile

Sources
  
  
Official list of Ministers of Foreign Affairs of Chile with appointment dates

External links
Official Website of the Ministry of Foreign Affairs of Chile  

Chile
 
Foreign Affairs
Chile, Foreign Affairs